Thiébault Island is a small island which lies next west of Charlat Island in the small group off the south end of Petermann Island in the Wilhelm Archipelago. It was discovered by the French Antarctic Expedition of 1908–10, and named by Jean-Baptiste Charcot for Mr. Thiébault, then French Minister to Argentina.

See also 
 List of Antarctic and sub-Antarctic islands

References

Islands of the Wilhelm Archipelago